De Divinatione (Latin, "Concerning Divination") is a philosophical dialogue about ancient Roman divination written in 44 BC by Marcus Tullius Cicero.

Contents

De Divinatione is set in two books, taking the form of a dialogue whose interlocutors are Cicero himself (speaking mostly in Book II, and including a fragment of Cicero's poem on his own consulship) and his brother Quintus. Book I deals with Quintus' apology of divination (in line with his essentially Stoic beliefs), while Book II contains Cicero's refutation of these from his Academic skeptic philosophical standpoint. Cicero concerns himself in some detail with the types of divination, dividing them into the "inspired" type (Latin furor, Gk. mania, "madness"), especially dreams, and the type which occurs via some form of skill of interpretation (i.e., haruspicy, extispicy, augury, astrology, and other oracles).

De Divinatione may be considered as a supplement to Cicero's De Natura Deorum. In De Divinatione, Cicero professes to relate the substance of a conversation held at Tusculum with his brother, in which Quintus, following the principles of the Stoics, supported the credibility of divination, while Cicero himself controverted it. The dialogue consists of two books, in the first Quintus enumerates the different kinds or classes of divination, with reasons in their favour. The second book contains a refutation by Cicero of his brother's arguments.

In the first book Quintus, after observing that divinations of various kinds have been common among all people, remarks that it is no argument against different forms of divination that we cannot explain how or why certain things happen. It is sufficient, that we know from experience and history that they do happen. He argues that although events may not always succeed as predicted, it does not follow that divination is not an art, any more than that medicine is not an art, because it does not always cure. Quintus offers various accounts of the different kinds of omens, dreams, portents, and divinations. He includes two remarkable dreams, one of which had occurred to Cicero and one to himself. He also asks if Greek history with its various accounts of omens should be also considered a fable.

In the second book Cicero provides arguments against auguries, auspices, astrology, lots, dreams, and every species of omens and prodigies. For example, he argues that he dreamt of Marius during his banishment because he often thought about him, not because it was some sort of omen. He states that during one's sleep, the soul is in a relaxed state and remnants of one's waking thoughts move freely within the soul. It concludes with a chapter on the evils of superstition, and Cicero's efforts to extirpate it. The whole thread is interwoven by curious and interesting stories.

De Divinatione is  notable as one of posterity's primary sources on the workings of Roman religion, and as a source for the conception of scientificity in Roman classical antiquity.

Quotes
 Nothing so absurd can be said that some philosopher had not said it.  (II, 119)
 That old saying by Cato is quite well known; he said he was surprised that one haruspex did not burst out laughing when he saw another one.  (II, 24, 51)

Citations

References

Further reading
Pease, Arthur Stanley, M. Tulli Ciceronis de Divinatione, 2 vol., Urbana 1920–1923 (reprint Darmstadt 1963).
Wardle, David, Cicero on divination : De divinatione, book 1. Transl., with introd. and historical commentary by David Wardle, Oxford 2006.
Engels, David, Das römische Vorzeichenwesen (753–27 v.Chr.). Quellen, Terminologie, Kommentar, historische Entwicklung, Stuttgart 2007, pp. 129–164.

External links

De Divinatione, Latin text
De Divinatione, English translation
Wardle, David - Cicero On Divination, Book 1 OUP Oxford, 30 Nov 2006 

Ancient Roman religion
Roman mythology
Philosophical works by Cicero
1st-century BC works